Prince Fu of the Second Rank, or simply Prince Fu, was the title of a princely peerage used in China during the Manchu-led Qing dynasty (1636–1912). As the Prince Fu peerage was not awarded "iron-cap" status, this meant that each successive bearer of the title would normally start off with a title downgraded by one rank vis-à-vis that held by his predecessor. However, the title would generally not be downgraded to any lower than a feng'en fuguo gong except under special circumstances.

The first bearer of the title was Yihui (奕譓; 1845–1877), the Daoguang Emperor's ninth son, who was granted the title "Prince Fu of the Second Rank" by his father in 1850. The title was passed down over three generations and held by four persons.

Members of the Prince Fu peerage

 Yihui (奕譓; 15 Nov 1845 – 22 Mar 1877; 1st), the Daoguang Emperor's ninth son, held the title Prince Fu of the Second Rank from 1850 to 1877, posthumously honoured as Prince Fu Jing of the Second Rank (孚敬郡王)
(a) Zaipei (載沛; 31 Mar 1872 – 23 Aug 1878; 2nd), initially named Zaihuang (載煌), Yidong's (a member from Prince Yu (愉)) sixth son and Yihui's adopted son, succeeded Yihui in 1877 as a beile
(a) Zaishu (載澍; 8 Nov 1870 – after 1909; 3rd), initially named Zaiji (載楫), Yizhan's (a member from Prince Zhi (直)) son and Yihui's adopted son, held the title of a beile from 1878 to 1897, his title stripped in 1897. His consort was 3rd daughter of Zhaoxiang, a younger brother of Empress Dowager Cixi. He had two daughters.
N/A
(a) Pujin (溥伒; 30 Aug 1893 – 1966; 4th), Zaiying's (a member from Prince Dun) eldest son and Yihui's adopted grandson, held the title of a beizi from 1897 to 1945. He was missing with his daughter during Cultural Revolution.
1 & 2 Yuquan (毓㟫) & Yuyan (毓巘)

Family tree

Legend:
 - Title bearers
 - Emperors

See also
 Royal and noble ranks of the Qing dynasty
 Prince Dun
 Prince Zhi (直)
 Prince Yu (愉)

References
 

Qing dynasty princely peerages